Silas Hare (November 13, 1827 – November 26, 1908)  was a U.S. Representative from Texas.

Early years

Silas Hare Sr. was born in Ross County, Ohio, to Jacob and Elizabeth Freshour Hare on November 13, 1827, and lived the first fourteen years of his life with his grandfather Daniel Hare. His father died in 1835, and in 1841, Hare rejoined his mother and other family members in Hamilton County, Indiana, near Noblesville, where he attended common and private schools. He studied law in Noblesville, and was admitted to the Indiana Bar Association in 1850 and commenced practice in Noblesville, Indiana.

Hare moved to Belton, Texas, in 1853 where he continued the practice of law.  In 1852, Hare began traveling to improve his health.  He visited Mexico, Central America, Hawaii (at that time, the Sandwich Islands), Oregon.

Military service
Hare served during the Mexican–American War in the 1st Indiana Volunteers 1846 and 1847.  At the Battle of Buena Vista, Hare was wounded by a lance.

During the Civil War Hare served as a captain in the Confederate States Army. He was appointed quartermaster, and later attained the rank of major in 1863, with the First Regiment of the Arizona Brigade stationed in Texas.

Public service

He served as Chief justice of New Mexico in 1862 under the Confederate Government. Hare settled in Sherman, Texas, in 1865 and resumed the practice of law. He served as district judge of the criminal court 1873–1876. He served as delegate to the Democratic National Convention in 1884.

Hare was elected as a Democrat to the Fiftieth and Fifty-first Congresses (March 4, 1887 – March 3, 1891). He was an unsuccessful candidate for renomination in 1890.

In 1890, Hare resumed the practice of law in Washington, D.C.

Personal life and death

In 1849, he married Octavia Elizabeth Rector of Circleville, Ohio. The couple had seven children: West Point cadet Luther Rector; Silas Jr who followed his father in public service; in addition to Winnie, Henry, George, Eula, and one child who died in infancy.  Octavia died June 5, 1890 and is interred at West Hill Cemetery in Sherman, Texas.

In 1903, the 76-year-old Hare married for a second time to 66-year-old Mary Louise Kennedy in a secret ceremony in Baltimore, Maryland taking his friends by surprise.  The elopement left the New York Times speculating about the honeymoon, "They have not returned, and the ex-Congressman's friends have no idea where they are."

Silas Hare died in Washington, D.C. on November 26, 1908, and is interred with his first wife in Sherman, Texas.

Mary Louise Kennedy Hare died November 3, 1912.

References

Sources

1827 births
1907 deaths
People from Noblesville, Indiana
People from Ross County, Ohio
People from Sherman, Texas
Confederate States Army officers
American military personnel of the Mexican–American War
People of Texas in the American Civil War
Democratic Party members of the United States House of Representatives from Texas
19th-century American politicians
Military personnel from Texas